Udara dilecta, the pale hedge blue or Himalayan pale hedge blue, is a small butterfly found in India, Nepal, China, and Malaya that belongs to the lycaenids or blues family. The species was first described by Frederic Moore in 1879.

Cited references

References
Fleming, W. A., 1975 Butterflies of West Malaysia & Singapore

External links
 With images.

Udara
Butterflies of Asia